Raúl Nuñez (1946/47-1996) was an Argentine writer. He was born in Buenos Aires in 1946, and settled in Barcelona in 1971 where he lived until 1988. Many of his novels were set against the backdrop of Barcelona's nightlife. These include titles such as Derrama whisky sobre tu amigo muerto, People, Sinatra, and La rubia del bar. Some of his books were turned into movies, for example, Francesc Betriu directed the movie version of Sinatra, while La rubia del bar was directed by Ventura Pons. From 1990 onwards, he wrote for the Valencia journal Turia, continuing until his death in that city in 1996.

Works
Poetry

 Poemas de los ángeles náufragos (1970)
 San John López del Camino (1971)
 Juglarock (La Mano en el Cajón, 1972)
 People (Tusquets Editores, 1974)
 Cannabis flan (Editorial Marte, 1983)
 Marihuana para los pájaros, anthology (Baile del Sol, 2008)

Novels
 Derrama whisky sobre tu amigo muerto (Producciones Editoriales, 1979)
 Sinatra. Novela urbana (Anagrama, 1984)
 La rubia del bar (Anagrama, 1986)
 A solas con Betty Boop (Laia, 1989)
 Fuera de combate, unpublished

Short novels and articles

 El aullido del mudo (Midons Editorial, 1994)
 Resaca / Hank Over. Un homenaje a Charles Bukowski (Caballo de Troya / Random House Mondadori, 2008) 

Other
 La rubia del bar. Script (1985)  Ventura Pons and Raúl Núñez

References

Argentine writers
1940s births
1996 deaths